The Guild of Nurses is a guild that was approved for formation in the City of London, England, on the 9 February 2016. It was formed to represent the nursing profession.

A guild is the beginning of a process towards forming a livery company.

See also 

 Nursing in the United Kingdom
 History of Nursing in the United Kingdom

External links

References

Livery companies
Nursing organisations in the United Kingdom
Nurses